The Seattle Medium is an African-American newspaper that serves Seattle, Washington. It was founded in January 1970, and bore the name The Medium from 1970 to 1983.

In its early days, the paper employed as many as 50 staff.

In 2014 the Medium completed a redesign, and remained committed to publishing in print as well as online.

The paper won three National Newspaper Publishers Association awards in 2021, including first place in the "Best Original Advertising" category.

References

External links

Call numbers for The Medium:

Call numbers for Seattle Medium:

African-American history in Seattle
African-American newspapers
Companies based in Seattle
Newspapers published in Seattle